Wamel is a village in the Dutch province of Gelderland. It is part of the municipality of West Maas en Waal, and lies about 3 km east of Tiel.

Wamel was a separate municipality until 1984, when it merged with Appeltern and Dreumel. The new municipality was first called "Wamel", but the name changed to "West Maas en Waal" in 1985. Ad van der Meer and Onno Boonstra, "Repertorium van Nederlandse gemeenten", KNAW, 2006.

It was first mentioned in 893 as in Uamele. The etymology is unclear. The village developed into an elongated settlement. The Dutch Reformed Church dates from 1572 and is a replacement of demolished earlier church. Between 1878 to 1879, a Roman Catholic church was built. It was destroyed in 1944, and rebuilt between 1952 and 1954. In 1840, it was home to 1,453 people.

People born in Wamel
Ivo Den Bieman (born 1967), footballer
Iris van Herpen (born 1984), fashion designer

Gallery

References

Populated places in Gelderland
Former municipalities of Gelderland
West Maas en Waal